Jesseca Liu (刘芷绚/劉芷絢; ; pinyin: "Liu Zhi Xuan" was her previous Chinese stage name) (born 13 February 1979) is a Malaysian actress, who is based in Singapore and was named as one of the Seven Princesses of Mediacorp in 2006. She was prominently a full-time Mediacorp artiste from 2004 to 2010. She is a contracted artiste under MediaCorp and managed under HIM International Music.

Early life
Jesseca Liu was born on 13 February 1979 in Langkawi, Malaysia, with the name Lao Chew Yen. She began modelling after graduating from Saito Academy in 2001. Languages often spoken by Liu are Cantonese, Hokkien, Mandarin, English and Malay. She finished second for a Malaysian beauty contest in 2001. Liu began acting in Malaysia in a few Chinese drama productions produced by Singapore-based companies.

Career
Liu was spotted by a producer in MediaCorp in 2004 who offered her the meaty role of He Yi Xuan in the sports themed drama, The Champion, starring opposite Qi Yuwu and Taiwanese actors Toro and Yan Xing Shu. She then began a career as a full-time actress in Singapore.

She snagged a role in the 100-episode drama series Portrait of Home in 2005. She played a Vietnamese bride Ruan Mianmian, and starred opposite veteran thespians Adrian Pang and Louise Lee. She was nominated for Best Supporting Actress and Most Popular Newcomer Award categories for the Star Awards 2005 ceremony with her role as Ruan Mianmian in Portrait of Home. She won the Most Popular Newcomer Award that year.

Her first lead role was Ding Yirou in Rhapsody in Blue in 2006. She was given opportunities to play lead roles thereafter. She filmed a movie by MediaCorp Raintree Pictures back in 2007 and it was scheduled to be screened in the second quarter of 2008. However, the screening of the movie was put to a halt due to copyright problems. Liu released a book diary, Jesseca's Diary (Chinese : 绚日记) in December 2007.

In March 2011, she starred in the Channel U blockbuster of the year Secrets For Sale, alongside Christopher Lee and Lin Meijiao. She played Jiaqi, a private investigator. The 13-episode serial was produced by Wawa productions.

In October 2011, she went on to play the role of a medical doctor Yang Minfei in the medical-themed series The Oath, which is one of the highest rated series of the year. The drama also starred Christopher Lee, Ann Kok and Ix Shen. She continued to star in other Wawa productions, such as Game Plan and Disclosed, and wrote two episodes of Let It Go.

Departure from MediaCorp
Liu's contract with MediaCorp expired in May 2010. She then went on to sign a contract with HIM International Music (Singapore) in the same year, while managing her family's spa business. Her first production under her new company was Channel U's feature film, Lost and Found, 小孩·狗, in 2010 with Taiwan's popular child star Xiao Xiao Bin and Taiwanese idol James Wen Sheng Hao. The film garnered the highest viewership amongst the other two feature films aired, starring Mediacorp actresses Joanne Peh and Felicia Chin respectively.

She then filmed Mediacorp Channel U's 2011 blockbuster drama, Secrets For Sale 《拍·卖》as the lead actress alongside Mediacorp actors Christopher Lee and Thomas Ong.

Together with Olivia Ong, she sang the theme song for The Silver Tribute Charity Night which was aired "live" on MediaCorp Channel 8 on 5 June 2011. This marked her first appearance on a live programme since Star Awards 2010.

Return to Mediacorp
Liu recently signed a new acting contract with Mediacorp in 2015, rendering her eligible for the Top 20 Most Popular Female Artistes nominations. She was last nominated in 2010. Prior to this, she starred in three Mediacorp drama series: Yours Fatefully, Blessings and Hand In Hand. She starred in a new Wawa production called The Queen.

In 2017, she was involved in a drama called Hero where she played as a female lead with many cameo appearance in the drama, which helped her gain a nomination for Best Actress. She also got involved in a drama called Eat Already? 2 where she played a cameo appearance as a doctor.

In 2018, she filmed two dramas called Mind Matters with Qi Yuwu and currently broadcast the drama called Babies On Board with Tay Ping Hui.

Jesseca has gotten 9 out of 10 Top 10 Most Popular Female Artistes from 2006 to 2010, 2016–2017, 2019, 2021 & 2022 respectively.

Personal life
Liu married Jeremy Chan on 16 July 2017.

Filmography

Film

Television

Compilation album

Awards and nominations

References

External links

Profile on xinmsn

Living people
1979 births
Malaysian people of Hokkien descent
Malaysian people of Chinese descent
21st-century Malaysian actresses
Singaporean television actresses
Malaysian film actresses
Malaysian television actresses